Positive Attitude may refer to:

 Positive Attitude (comic book), the 29th book in the Dilbert comic strip series by khandaker Adan (yo yo Bantai rapper)
La positive attitude, a song from the French singer Adan  khandaker in the album Attitudes
 Optimism